Main Hoon Shahid Afridi, is a  2013 Pakistani sports film directed by Syed Ali Raza Usama and produced by Humayun Saeed & Shahzad Nasib. The film features Humayun Saeed, Javed Shaikh and Noman Habib in the lead roles. Nadeem Baig, Shafqat Cheema, Ismail Tara, Ainy Jaffri, Hamza Ali Abbasi and Shehzad Sheikh also play important roles in the film, whilst Shahid Afridi.

Plot 
Akbar Deen a cricketer who is the pride and joy of his family that includes a sweet mother, a disciplined father, a loving wife Zara and son, Mikaal. It is cleared in the beginning that Zara's father Mian Asif Qureshi hates Akbar. Akbar is implicated with illegal drugs after he gets drunk by an orange juice drink and a dance item by Mathira in Dubai. Akbar is imprisoned for a crime which he did not commit and his career is out of the cricket grounds.

Years later, Shahid, a youngster from Sialkot (where Akbar Deen lived) works the cash register in a local restaurant, pushes the owner of his local cricket club, Malik Khalid to try a team for a Pepsi-sponsored tournament. Shahid is passionate about cricket and just has one dream – To meet his inspiration "The one and only" Shahid Afridi face-to-face one day.

Akbar is back in Sialkot after solving his past puzzles and is convinced to become the coach of this team which he later renames Sialkot Shaheens. However, he doesn't mention anything to them about his past endeavour. Akbar also learns that his son Mikal is the captain of a rival team, Islamabad Hunters. Sialkot Shaheens play and lose their first match against Islamabad Hunters after the match Malik becomes angry, Akbar tells them that they should not always rely on one person Shahid to win the match because a match is won by the whole team and not just one man. 
Meanwhile, Mikal reveals everything to the social media about Akbar being his father and also his dark past. Akbar confronts Asif Qureshi over this and is told by Asif that his team will not be able to compete in this tournament. 
Sialkot wins all their next matches to qualify for the final against Islamabad Hunters. During a press conference, Mikal and Shahid start fighting each other. Asif Qureshi tells his men to injure any one member of Sialkot team they choose the wicketkeeper Michael. Zara hears his conversation and also learns Akbar being implicated with drugs was a plan of her father she tells everything to Akbar.

Asif Qureshi's men attack Michael but Akbar saves him and takes him to hospital despite not being 100 percent fit he insists coach to let him play final match. Akbar's father also learns the truth and forgives him. Before the start of the match, the coach of Islamabad Hunters gives drugs to a fast bowler. Sialkot needed to chase 203 runs in 20 overs to win the tournament. In the end, 6 runs were required on the last ball Mikal delivered a short ball which Shahid hooked for six taking his team home. Right after the match, Akbar reunites with Mikal and Zara. In the end, Shahid Afridi appears and tells Shahid that it doesn't matter how many matches he plays for Pakistan but he should play as Shahid and not think of himself as Shahid Afridi.

Cast 
 Humayun Saeed as Akbar is the coach of a team of misfits, Sialkot Shaheens. He is determined and keen that his team wins the Under 19 national Pepsi cup but his dark past keeps coming his way to haunt him and stop him.
 Noman Habib as Shahid Bhatti, a boy who dreams to become Shahid Afridi, does not know the price he has to pay to achieve the ultimate goal he has ever lived for.
 Nadeem Baig as Imam Deen is a man living an abandoned life to evade everyone around him who reminds him of his ugly past he once faced because of his son Akbar Deen (Hanaan-ul-Haque).
 Javed Shaikh as Mian Asif Qureshi – Courage is the only word in his dictionary.
 Shehzad Sheikh as Mikaal Qureshi is a young handsome man and the Captain of Islamabad Hunters with an unconquered winning streak.
 Hamza Ali Abbasi as Maulvi Majeed is a fast bowler of Sialkot Shaheens and is slightly racist and short-tempered by nature.
 Mahnoor Baloch as Sara is now a woman of few words now left with a broken heart, looking for answers from people around her.
 Shafqat Cheema as Bashir Bhatti, a person who lived his life in gambling and denying every bond he has towards his family including his wife, his daughter and his dreamer son (Shahid Bhatti).
 Ismail Tara as Malick Khalid would risk everything including his wife's bangles and motorbike to save the last remaining asset he inherited from his forefathers, Malick Cricket Club.
 Gohar Rasheed as Kashif also known as Kaali Aandhi is a blazingly fast bowler with an unbeatable speed.
 Ainan Arif as Micheal Magnet – The backbone of the team and irreplaceable keeper who draws any ball in his gloves like a magnet, a Christian in the team
 Asim Mehmood as Shiekh also known as Deeware Teen is the opening batsman of the team who would stand like an iron wall between the opponent's ball and his wickets.
 Summer Nicks as Thomas J. Nicks, a ruthless Australian coach hired specially to train Islamabad Hunters to turn them into a coldblooded invincible team.
 Saife Hassan as Doctor
 Shahid Afridi, special appearance in the end
 Muhammad Asif Iqbal, special appearance as Sallu Bhai
 Uzain Saeed, As A ChildHood Of Mikaal Who Was The Captain Of Islamabad Hunters

Soundtrack
The soundtrack consists of five songs, penned and composed by the duo Shani-Kami.

Development

The film's writer and host of the night Vasay Chaudhry elaborated on the kind of cinema actor-producer Humayun Saeed and his team support. "Song, dance and drama is the style of cinema that we believe in," said Chaudhry. "From 1947 to 2001, more than 4,300 films were released in Pakistan with dances, songs and drama. This is as much our style of cinema as it is our neighbour’s."

After Chaudhry's brief on the film, film distributor Nadeem Mandviwalla shared his views. "On all such jubilant occasions, we should never forget to pay tribute to and thank people like Nadeem Baig and Javed Sheikh who have seen the industry go through thick-and-thin and have been resilient," said Mandviwalla. According to Mandviwalla, Main Hoon Shahid Afridi is expected to do a great job at the local box office. Like every cricket-loving citizen of Pakistan, Saeed also expressed his love for Shahid Afridi and how this film is a tribute to him. "I would have easily made a shaadi biyaah type of a film, but I always wanted to pay tribute to one of our own Pakistani stars in their lifetime," said Saeed."Whether he performs or not, Shahid Afridi will continue to be Shahid Afridi for us," said Saeed. He then thanked all the cast and crew for their continuous support and hard work but failed to mention Mathira, who performed an item number in the film. She walked out of the conference in protest. Main Hoon Shahid Afridi also features Javed Sheikh, Nadeem Baig, Shafqat Cheema, Humayun Saeed, Mahnoor Baloch and Noman Habib, who plays the lead role.

Shahzad Nasib, who invested $1 million into the film said, Humayun initially had asked the legendary cricketer himself to act in the lead role. "They offered me the role but my elders didn't let me act, but I happily gave them permission to use my name as this film will bring a positive message," Shahid Afridi later told AFP.Veteran actor Javed Sheikh talked about his experience in contributing to the new age of Pakistani cinema. "I must assure you that Humayun Saeed and his team will bring you a pleasant surprise on the first day of Eid," said Sheikh, who also believes that if Pakistani dramas can beat Indian dramas, then Pakistani films can also beat Indian films. "The new wave of Pakistani cinema will come from Karachi and the new film-makers will make better films than India in much more limited circumstances," he added.

Senior actor Shafqat Cheema, in his signature aggressive style, explained his character, which is significantly different from the one in Bol. Being one of the most senior cast members, Nadeem Baig said he is hopeful of the new Pakistani cinema, while he grieved over artists going to Bollywood. "There is nothing bad about going to Bollywood, but not at the cost of your own cinema," said Baig.  "Respect your soil and culture because it’s a part of you and you are a part of it."Director Syed Ali Raza had a more proactive approach towards the new wave of Pakistani cinema. "We are not here to compete but to walk hand-in-hand with our neighbours, for the cause of entertainment," he said. "Whether you win or lose doesn't matter, but play with such a spirit that you can look into each other’s eyes after the game," said Raza, using one of the lines from the film. The evening ended with the unveiling of some very catchy songs from the film after which we can easily say that the audience is definitely in for some good surprises.

Release
The film premiered on 22 August 2013 at Atrium Cinemas in Karachi. It released on 23 August 2013.

Reception

Box office
Main Hoon Shahid Afridi earned  in its first week of release. Film saw falls from Week Two onward and collected  in its Lifetime run and got a verdict of Average.

Critical reception
Mohammad Kamran Jawaid of DAWN praised the performances of Saeed and Habib and wrote, "The film is family friendly – given that one shields the young-one’s eyes when Mathira belly-dances like an Arab slave-girl". Mahwash Badar of The Express Tribune rated it 5 stars out of 5 and said "Bravo to the director for knowing the people who will be watching the movie and playing to their emotions, needs and level of understanding; goes to show you that a movie doesn’t have to be a social revolution, sometimes it just has to be a movie", "The dialogue was strong, overall acting deserves a round of applause." Momin Ali Munshi of Galaxy Lollywood rated the film 4.5 out of 5 stars and wrote, "Main Hoon Shahid Afridi  is a commercial made to entertain the audience, The music of the film was one of its highlight the Mathira/Mahnoor Baloch item number is without doubt the highlight of the film and it lived up to its hype, The costumes, seductive moves, everything was just mind-blowing". He praised the performances of Saeed, Sheikh, Tara and Abbasi.

Accolades

References

Further reading

External links 
 
 

2013 films
2010s Urdu-language films
Lollywood films
Cricket films
Pakistani sports drama films
Shahid Afridi
Six Sigma Plus
2010s sports drama films
Urdu-language Pakistani films